The 2020–21 National T20 Cup was a Twenty20 domestic cricket competition that was played in Pakistan. It was the seventeenth season of the National T20 Cup, and started on 30 September 2020, and finished on 18 October 2020. Northern cricket team were the defending champions. The season featured an expanded format, with an increase from 18 to 33 matches. In July 2020, the Pakistan Cricket Board (PCB) announced that tournament would be held either in Multan or Rawalpindi. In August 2020, it was confirmed that the first leg will be played in Multan, with the final leg being held at Rawalpindi.

On the opening day of the tournament, Abdullah Shafique of Central Punjab scored a century on his debut. He became the second cricketer, after India's Shivam Bhambri, to score a century on both his T20 and first-class debuts. Khyber Pakhtunkhwa's bowler Shaheen Afridi took two five-wicket hauls in four games, with 5/20 against Balochistan, and 5/21 against Sindh. Following the conclusion of the matches in Multan, Northern won all five of their games to lead the tournament. They also recorded their tenth-consecutive victory in T20 cricket, equalling the record of the Lahore Lions.

In the first match in Rawalpindi, Northern's winning streak came to an end, after they lost to Central Punjab. The next match saw Khushdil Shah score the fastest century in a Twenty20 match by a Pakistani batsman, doing so in 35 balls. On 10 October 2020, Shoaib Malik became the first Pakistani batsman to score 10,000 runs in Twenty20 cricket, doing so in Khyber Pakhtunkhwa's match against Balochistan. On 12 October 2020, during the match against Balochistan, Central Punjab's captain Babar Azam became the fastest batsman to score 1,000 runs in the tournament, doing so in his 27th innings. The following day, Kamran Akmal, also playing for Central Punjab, became the first wicket-keeper to affect 100 stumpings in Twenty20 cricket.

On 11 October 2020, Northern became the first team to progress to the semi-finals of the tournament, after they beat Southern Punjab by five runs, giving them six wins from their first seven matches. Following the conclusion of the first match played on 14 October 2020, Khyber Pakhtunkhwa and Sindh had also qualified for the semi-finals. On 16 October 2020, Southern Punjab became the fourth and final team to reach the semi-finals, after they beat Balochistan by seven wickets. The fixture was also the final professional match to be played by Umar Gul, who retired from cricket following a career that spanned twenty years.

In the first semi-final, Southern Punjab beat Northern by seven wickets to advance to the final of the tournament. The second semi-final saw Khyber Pakhtunkhwa beat Sindh by eight wickets to join Southern Punjab in the tournament's final. In the final, Khyber Pakhtunkhwa beat Southern Punjab by ten runs to win the tournament.

Squads

On 9 September 2020, the PCB confirmed all the squads for the tournament. Central Punjab cricketer Salman Butt refused to take part in the tournament, after he was demoted from the team's first XI. Later in September 2020, Sindh's Rumman Raees was ruled out of the tournament due to a spinal injury, with Ghulam Mudassar named as his replacement. In Central Punjab's squad, Ali Shan replaced Faheem Ashraf, who was ruled out for the matches in Multan, due to fitness issues. Mohammad Ismail replaced Imad Wasim in Northern's squad, for the matches in Multan.

Ahead of the matches in Rawalpindi, three teams made changes to their squads, as they picked performing players from their respective second XI squads. Balochistan added Abdul Bangalzai, who replaced Imran Farhat. Central Punjab replaced Bilal Asif with Muhammad Akhlaq. Southern Punjab also made changes to their squad; Bilawal Bhatti, Mohammad Irfan and Rahat Ali were left out, with Dilbar Hussain, Mohammad Imran and Zain Abbas being included. On 10 October 2020, Naseem Shah was withdrawn from Central Punjab's squad following a groin injury, and was replaced by Waqas Maqsood. On 14 October 2020, Balochistan made two changes to their squad, with Umaid Asif and Akif Javed being replaced by Akhtar Shah and Taj Wali respectively.

Points table

Fixtures
On 24 September 2020, the PCB named all the match officials for the tournament.

Round-robin

Finals

References

External links
 Series home at ESPN Cricinfo

2020 in Pakistani cricket
Domestic cricket competitions in 2020–21 
2020–21 National T20 Cup
Pakistani cricket seasons from 2000–01